Carlos Nicolás Cinalli (born 14 February 1981) is an Argentine former professional footballer who played as a defender for clubs in Argentina, Chile and Portugal.

Career
Born in La Plata, Argentina, Cinalli began playing football for the youth teams of Gimnasia y Esgrima de La Plata. He made his debut with Gimnasia's senior team in a Primera División Argentina match against Newell's Old Boys on 21 November 1999. He made only one more league appearance for Gimnasia.

Clubs
  Gimnasia y Esgrima de La Plata 1999–2000
  Sporting Braga 2000
  Unión Española 2001
  Uniao Leiria 2001–2002
  Defensores de Cambaceres 2002–2003
  Villa San Carlos 2003–2005

References

External links
 

1981 births
Living people
Argentine footballers
Association football defenders
Club de Gimnasia y Esgrima La Plata footballers
Unión Española footballers
Chilean Primera División players
Argentine Primera División players
Argentine expatriate footballers
Argentine expatriate sportspeople in Chile
Expatriate footballers in Chile
Argentine expatriate sportspeople in Portugal
Expatriate footballers in Portugal
Footballers from La Plata